Creston High School may refer to:

Creston High School (Iowa), Creston, Iowa
Creston High School (Michigan), Grand Rapids, Michigan, opened in 1923 as Creston Junior High School; became Grand Rapids City High-Middle School in 2013
Creston High School (Washington), Creston, Washington